Michael Joseph Hoeppner (born June 1, 1949) is an American prelate of the Catholic Church who served as the bishop of the Diocese of Crookston in Minnesota from November 30, 2007, to April 13, 2021.

After a Vatican investigation concluded that Hoeppner mishandled an allegation of sexual abuse by a priest, Pope Francis requested and received Hoeppner's resignation as bishop.

Biography

Early life 
Hoeppner was born on June 1, 1949, in Winona, Minnesota.  He  undertook his theological studies at the Pontifical North American College in Rome.

Hoeppner was ordained to the priesthood for the Diocese of Winona on June 29, 1975, by Pope Paul VI at St. Peter's Basilica in Rome.

Hoeppner received a Licentiate of Canon Law from Saint Paul University in Ottawa, Ontario. In addition to assignments within the Catholic school system, Hoeppner served as diocesan director of vocations. He served as Winona's judicial vicar from 1988 to 1997 and was later appointed vicar general by Bishop John Vlazny.

Following Bishop Vlazny's transfer to the Archdiocese of Portland in Oregon, Hoeppner was elected as diocesan administrator to oversee the diocese until the installation of Bishop Bernard Harrington.  Harrington then appointed Hoeppner as his vicar general.

Bishop of Crookston
Hoeppner was appointed bishop of the Diocese of Crookston by Pope Benedict XVI on September 28, 2007. Hoeppner was consecrated by Archbishop Harry Flynn on November 30, 2007.

In May 2017, Hoeppner became the first American bishop to be sued personally for coercion. The lawsuit was filed by Ronald Vasek, a former diaconate candidate in the diocese.  Vasek alleged that Monsignor Roger Grundhaus sexually abused him when he was a teenager during a trip to Ohio in 1971.  Vasek made his allegations known to the diocese in 2011.  In October 2015, Vasek signed a letter recanting his accusations against Grundhaus.  Vasek claims that Hoeppner threatened retaliation against Vasek's son, a priest in the diocese, if he failed to sign it. Vasek said that Hoeppner's actions were like "being abused all over again."

On September 20, 2017, Vasek, the diocese and Hoeppner reached a legal settlement.  As part of the agreement, Hoeppner released the letter from October 2015. Vasek's attorney, Mike Finnegan, said the letter proved Hoeppner's guilt. In September 2019, the Archdiocese of St. Paul and Minneapolis announced it would investigate Hoeppner's actions.  This was the first investigation in the United States of a bishop for failure to the follow the procedures Pope Francis established in the document Vos estis lux mundi.

Retirement 
Following the archdiocese investigation, Pope Francis requested and received Hoeppner's resignation as the bishop of the Diocese of Crookston. It was accepted by the pope on April 13, 2021.  In his final mass, Hoeppner apologized "...to you and everyone, as I've apologized to the Holy Father, for any failures of mine in governing as bishop."

See also
 Catholic Church hierarchy
 Catholic Church in the United States
 Historical list of the Catholic bishops of the United States
 List of Catholic bishops of the United States
 Lists of patriarchs, archbishops, and bishops

References

External links 
Roman Catholic Diocese of Crookston Official Site

1949 births
Living people
People from Winona, Minnesota
Pontifical North American College alumni
Roman Catholic Diocese of Winona-Rochester
Roman Catholic bishops of Crookston
21st-century Roman Catholic bishops in the United States